Prepare to Be Wrong is an EP by Straylight Run, released on October 4, 2005 by Victory Records. The song "It Never Gets Easier" was originally titled "Costello".

Release
"Hands in the Sky (Big Shot)" was released to radio on October 25, 2005. In October and November, the band supported Simple Plan. The band supported Motion City Soundtrack on the mtvU Campus Invasion tour in April 2006. In May, the band toured Australia alongside Matchbook Romance.

Track listing
All songs written by Straylight Run, except where noted
"I Don't Want This Anymore" – 3:43
"It Never Gets Easier" – 4:09
"A Slow Descent" – 5:12
"Hands in the Sky (Big Shot)" – 5:42
"Later That Year" – 4:16
"With God on Our Side" – 6:19 (Bob Dylan)

Credits
Isaac Burker – guitar
Shaun Cooper – bass
Jeff DaRosa – backing vocals
John Nolan – vocals, guitar, piano
Michelle Nolan – vocals, guitar, piano
Will Noon – drums

References

Straylight Run albums
2005 EPs
Victory Records EPs
Albums produced by Mike Sapone